Lizard Pond is a lake located on Vancouver Island, Canada, south east of Hiwatchas Mountain.

Hydrology

Access

Fishing

References

Alberni Valley
Lakes of British Columbia
Bodies of water of Vancouver Island
Barclay Land District